Queen of the Damned is a 2002 vampire film directed by Michael Rymer, based on the third novel of Anne Rice's The Vampire Chronicles series, The Queen of the Damned (1988), although the film contains many plot elements from the novel's predecessor The Vampire Lestat. A stand-alone sequel to Interview with the Vampire (1994), the film stars Stuart Townsend, Aaliyah as the vampire Queen Akasha in her final film role, Marguerite Moreau, Vincent Pérez and Lena Olin. Townsend and Matthew Newton replaced Tom Cruise and Antonio Banderas in the roles Lestat and Armand respectively.

The film is dedicated to Aaliyah, who died in a plane crash on August 25, 2001, after she had shot all her scenes. Released on February 22, 2002, in North America and on April 4, 2002, in Australia, it received generally negative reviews from critics and did not perform well at the box office.

Plot
The vampire Lestat is awakened from decades of slumber by the sound of a hard rock band, and proceeds to take over as their lead singer. Achieving international success, Lestat, having revealed the existence of vampires, taunts the others of his kind during an interview for promoting his first and only live concert.

Jesse Reeves, a researcher for the paranormal studies group Talamasca, is intrigued by Lestat's lyrics after hearing one of his songs play on TV and tells the rest of the group her theory that he really is a vampire. Her mentor, David Talbot, takes her aside and tells her they know what he is and that a vampire called Marius made him. David also shows her Lestat's journal that he recovered and gives it to Jesse for her to read on the condition that she promises not to pursue Lestat. In the journal, Lestat recalls how he was turned into a vampire by Marius and how he awoke Akasha, the first vampire, with his music. Unsatisfied with what she read, Jesse tracks Lestat down to a London vampire club called The Admiral's Arms, where he saves her from three vampires and confronts her about Marius.

In Los Angeles, Lestat is visited by Marius, who warns him that the other vampires will not tolerate his flamboyant public profile. Marius also reveals that Lestat's new music has awakened Akasha and begs him to cancel his concert, which he refuses. Meanwhile, Akasha, who is searching for Lestat, arrives at The Admiral's Arms. After the vampires reveal their plan to kill Lestat at his concert, Akasha torches the club and kills all the vampires inside. Jesse arrives at Los Angeles and gives Lestat his journal back. She then asks him to show her what being a vampire is like. Lestat scoffs at the idea, but Jesse convinces him to spend his last moments before the concert with her. The two spend some time together and Jesse later asks Lestat to turn her, telling him she wants to be with him and that she wants to know everything he does. Lestat angrily refuses, and shows her what it's like for a vampire to feed aggressively on a human. He comes back to her asking her if this is truly what she wants, she recoils in fear from him, he scoffs at her agreeing and then leaves.

While performing at his concert in Death Valley, a group of vampires attack Lestat. With Marius' help, they both fend off most of the vampires until Akasha bursts through the stage and takes Lestat with her. Akasha brings Lestat to her new home, where the two vampires have sexual intercourse, during which time Lestat becomes spellbound by Akasha and is forced to obey her, and Akasha proclaims Lestat her new king. After the concert, Jesse is taken to the home of her aunt, Maharet, who later reveals herself to be one of the Ancient Vampires. Knowing Akasha's plan to take over the world, the Ancient Vampires discuss their plans to destroy the Queen by drinking from her and draining her of her blood. However, they believe that whoever drinks the Queen's last drop will not survive.

Empowered by Akasha's blood, Lestat and the Queen confront the Ancient Vampires. When they refuse to join her, Akasha then commands Lestat to kill Jesse, as The Queen sees her both as an enemy, due to being Maharet's descendant, and as food, with Akasha making an example out of her for those who dare disobey her command. Lestat ostensibly obeys, but after drinking Jesse's blood, comes to his senses and is released from Akasha's power. He angrily requests for his "crown" and Akasha openly gives him her arm to feed on. Lestat then turns on her and begins to drain Akasha's blood. With the help of the Ancients, Akasha's power diminishes. Maharet is the last to drink Akasha's blood, killing Akasha. Lestat goes to Jesse and, cradling her in his arms, gives her his blood as Maharet turns into a marble statue and "sleeps", becoming the new Queen of the Damned.

Lestat and Jesse, who is now a vampire, visit David and return Lestat's journal. When asked by David what it is like, Jesse offers to turn him into a vampire to which he replies he's too old for immortality. Jesse then bids David goodbye and goes to embrace him. David shows fear and rejects the embrace, sensing his hesitation Jesse looks hurt but nods in understanding. She leaves with Lestat. 
A few moments later, David is greeted by Marius.

The film closes with Lestat and Jesse walking hand in hand, among mortals, into the night.

Cast
 Stuart Townsend as Lestat
 Matthew Lassall as Lestat's Violinist Double
 Aaliyah as Akasha
 Marguerite Moreau as Jesse
 Rachael Tanner as Young Jesse
 Paul McGann as David Talbot
 Lena Olin as Maharet
 Christian Manon as Mael
 Claudia Black as Pandora
 Vincent Perez as Marius
 Bruce Spence as Khayman
 Matthew Newton as Armand
 Pia Miranda as Jesse's Roommate

Jonathan Davis played a Scalper and also provided the uncredited singing voice for Lestat. In addition to Davis, several real-life musicians also appeared in the film including Darren Wilson as Sound Engineer, Rowland S. Howard as Vampire Guitarist, Hugo Race as Vampire Bass, Robin Casinader as Vampire Pianist, and former Jerk member Johnathan Devoy as James. Serena Altschul made a cameo as herself.

Development
Warner Bros. had acquired the film rights to several of Anne Rice's novels—the first three Vampire Chronicles and The Mayfair Witches trilogy—after a 1988 takeover of Lorimar Productions. An eventual adaptation of Interview with the Vampire (directed by Neil Jordan and produced by David Geffen) was released in 1994, although not without controversy, particularly over fan reaction to the casting of Tom Cruise as Lestat, an objection initially shared by Anne Rice, which she recanted after seeing the finished film.

After the commercial and critical success of Interview, Neil Jordan began initial development of the novel's sequel, The Vampire Lestat, although this went nowhere.

As the rights to the novels would revert to Anne Rice at the end of 2000, initial story meetings to adapt one or both of the remaining Vampire Chronicles began in 1998. The decision was made early to substantially rewrite the plot, and to base most of the movie on the third book: The Vampire Lestat was considered too broad and episodic for a two-hour feature film, although the novel's setup of Lestat's awakening and career as a rock star was used. It was also decided to focus on Lestat as the primary character, and the back story of Akasha and the Story of the Twins were omitted, despite these being virtually central to the plot of the novel.

Displeased with the lack of progress, and more particularly with the studio's lack of consultation with her over the script development, author Anne Rice wrote a critical reply to a fan's question about the film in 1998:

During 1999, the script was developed by TV screenwriter Scott Abbott and Australian writer/director Michael Petroni. Another Australian, Michael Rymer, was confirmed to direct. Rymer suggested the film be shot in his home city of Melbourne, which would save considerably on production costs.

The first actor cast was R&B singer Aaliyah (who had made her film and acting debut in Romeo Must Die) as Akasha, the eponymous Queen of the Damned. The search for an actor to play Lestat took much longer—the idea of Tom Cruise reprising the role was considered but dismissed—although front runners included Wes Bentley, Josh Hartnett and Heath Ledger. Irish actor Stuart Townsend assumed the role in 2000, and the final cast included Vincent Perez as Marius, Paul McGann as David Talbot, Lena Olin as Maharet and Marguerite Moreau as Jesse Reeves. Australian actors included Claudia Black as Pandora and Matthew Newton as Armand.

Production
With a large cast of international and Australian actors, Queen of the Damned began principal photography on October 2, 2000 and ended on February 27, 2001, in a former biscuit factory, converted into a studio in the Melbourne suburb of St. Albans. Location filming took place around the city of Melbourne, although some filming was done in Los Angeles. For the scenes of Lestat's concert in Death Valley, over 3000 goths were recruited from Melbourne nightclubs and on the Internet, then driven on a fleet of buses to a quarry in Werribee to act as extras.

Soundtracks

The songs for Lestat's band were written and performed by Jonathan Davis of the nu metal band Korn, and Richard Gibbs, although Davis's contractual commitments to Sony BMG meant that his vocals could not appear on the soundtrack album. Instead, the vocals were re-recorded by other musicians for the soundtrack's official release: Wayne Static of Static-X ("Not Meant for Me"), David Draiman of Disturbed ("Forsaken"), Chester Bennington of Linkin Park ("System"), Marilyn Manson ("Redeemer"), and Jay Gordon of Orgy ("Slept So Long"). During the end credits "Not Meant for Me" is played. It is Jonathan Davis' version although the credits list it as the Wayne Static version from the album.

Davis also made a small cameo in the film. When Jesse arrives in Los Angeles, a scalper (Jonathan Davis) attempts to sell her tickets to Lestat's show.

The soundtrack also contains other songs featured in the film: "Body Crumbles" by Dry Cell, "Cold" by Static-X, "Dead Cell" by Papa Roach, "Excess" by Tricky, "Headstrong" by Earshot, "Penetrate" by Godhead, "Down with the Sickness" by Disturbed, "Change (In the House of Flies)" by Deftones and "Before I'm Dead" by Kidneythieves.

The score for the film was also composed by Gibbs and Davis. Both the main soundtrack album and score album were released in 2002.

Frank Fitzpatrick and Rich Dickerson were the Music Supervisors for the film and the soundtrack album.

The original studio recording of "Careless (Akasha's Lament)" was written and produced by Davis and Gibbs, during the Queen of the Damned sessions. Vocals were by Davis, keyboards by Gibbs, guitars by James Shaffer, Brian Welch, and Davis, and drums by Vinnie Colaiuta. Davis released the song in downloadable form via Amazon and iTunes on November 16, 2007.

Plans to record a duet between Aaliyah and Davis never materialised, due to Aaliyah's death.

Release

Author's reaction
By July 2001, author Anne Rice had mellowed her previous stance on the film, much as she had with Interview. When asked about the film's progress, she answered:

Everything I hear about the movie is good. Warner Bros. is extremely enthusiastic. They are working very hard to make it perfect. I have no real news. Let me repeat what I mentioned in a recent message. I met Stuart Townsend, the young man who is playing Lestat and he was absolutely charming. He had Lestat's excellent speaking voice and his feline grace. I cannot wait to see him in the film.

By late 2001, Rice had seen the completed film and was sufficiently satisfied to allow her name to be used on promotional material, although she later became disillusioned about it and dismissed the film in 2003, a year after its release, stating that a television series format would be more suited to the source material. Subsequently, Rice urged fans on her Facebook page to "simply forget" about the film, which she said was something she could not relate to as far as her work was concerned and while she did encourage the studio not to do the film, in the end, it hurt her to see her work "mutilated" as it had been depicted.

Public and critical reaction
Queen of the Damned was released on February 22, 2002 in the United States and Canada.

The film received mostly negative reviews from critics, with several reviewers such as Roger Ebert describing it as "goofy" or "damned". The film has an approval "rotten" rating of 17% at Rotten Tomatoes based on 130 reviews, with the site's consensus calling the film "A muddled and campy MTV-styled vampire movie with lots of eye candy and bad accents." Despite negative reviews, Queen of the Damned nonetheless topped the box office on its opening weekend, against fairly weak competition. The film grossed $45.5 million on a $35 million budget.

Allan Menzies
In December 2002, ten months after the film released, Allan Menzies, an obsessed fan from West Lothian, Scotland who claimed to have seen it more than a hundred times, killed his friend, Thomas McKendrick and drank his blood. He claimed in court that Aaliyah's character Queen Akasha told him to do it. He was found guilty and sentenced to life in prison; a year later he was discovered  dead in his cell of an apparent suicide.

Home media 
Queen of the Damned was released on DVD on August 27, 2002. Queen of the Damned was released on Blu-ray on September 18, 2012, and re-released on Blu-ray on February 7, 2017.

References

External links

 
 
 
 
 

2002 fantasy films
2002 films
2002 horror films
2000s American films
2000s Australian films
2000s English-language films
2000s supernatural horror films
American fantasy films
American sequel films
American supernatural horror films
American vampire films
Australian fantasy films
Australian supernatural horror films
Films based on American horror novels
Films based on multiple works of a series
Films based on works by Anne Rice
Films directed by Michael Rymer
Films scored by Richard Gibbs
Films shot in Melbourne
Films shot in Los Angeles
Films with screenplays by Michael Petroni
Village Roadshow Pictures films
Warner Bros. films
Works based on The Vampire Chronicles